Ghulaam is an Indian action crime thriller television series, which premiered on Life OK on 16 January 2017.

Param Singh, Niti Taylor and Vikkas Manaktala played the lead roles. The thriller series ended on 25 August 2017 due to channel's new line-up policy.

Synopsis
The story revolves around Rangeela who is a slave to Veer. He dupes Shivani, an innocent girl into marrying Veer. Thus, begins his journey from slavery to freedom.

Cast

Main cast
 Param Singh as Rangeela, Ghulaam
 Niti Taylor as Shivani Mathur, Rangeela's wife
 Vikkas Manaktala as Chaudhary Veer Pratap, Rangeela's foster brother

Recurring cast

 Aakash Pandey as Balam, Rangeela's friend and confidante
 Sareeka Dhillon as Rashmi Khare / Rashmi Manmeet Pratap, Dillīwali, Veer's sister-in-law
 Pradeep Duhan as Chaudhary Manmeet Pratap, Veer's younger brother, Rashmi's husband
 Ridhima Tiwari as Maldawali, Veer's sister-in-law
 Vishal Puri as Chaudhary Jageer Pratap, Veer's elder brother, Maldawali's husband
 Bhagwan Tiwari as Chaudhary Bhishma Pratap, Veer and Rangeela's father
 Zahida Parveen as Chaudhary Gulguli, Veer's mother
 Samta Sagar as Shanti, Rangeela's mother, Bhishma Pratap's wife
 Devi Dolo as Manju, Balam's wife, Rangeela's sister-in-law
 Amit Jaat as Phantom, Rangeela's friend and confidante
 Shahab Khan as Shivani's Uncle 
 Nidhi Jha as STS officer Radhika, Cameo appearance
 Indraneil Sengupta as STS officer Raghav Verma, Rashmi's fiancé (cameo appearance)
 Viraj Kapoor (kid actor) as Katta, the next Ghulaam 
 Ankur Tandon as Rajan as Ring fighter

References

External links
 

2017 Indian television series debuts
2017 Indian television series endings
Hindi-language television shows
Indian drama television series
Life OK original programming